The Secret of Three Points (also known as Three Points and The Three Points) is a 1952 Italian adventure film directed by Carlo Ludovico Bragaglia.

Cast
 Massimo Girotti as Massimo del Colle
 Tamara Lees as Countess Marion Lamberti
 Umberto Spadaro as Colonel Grimaldi
 Roldano Lupi as Duke of Melia
 Piero Pastore as Riccardo Albertini
 Arturo Bragaglia as The Innkeeper
 Ignazio Leone 
 Paola Quattrini

References

External links
 
 The Secret of Three Points at Variety Distribution

1952 films
1950s Italian-language films
1952 adventure films
Films directed by Carlo Ludovico Bragaglia
Italian adventure films
Films with screenplays by Age & Scarpelli
Films set in the 1860s
Films set in Sicily
Films scored by Alessandro Cicognini
Italian black-and-white films
1950s Italian films